The Orphan Queen is an epic fantasy and romance from Incarnate series author Jodi Meadows. The Huffington Post ranked it as one of the top YA books of 2015.

The novel's protagonist is Wilhelmina, the lost princess of Aecor, which was conquered and absorbed into the Indigo empire.

References

2015 American novels
Novels about orphans
Katherine Tegen Books books